Tytthus pubescens is a species of insect, belonging to the genus Tytthus.

It has cosmopolitan distribution.

References

Miridae
Cosmopolitan arthropods
Insects described in 1931